Pliješ is a village in the municipality of Pljevlja, Montenegro. It is located close to the Serbian border.

Demographics
According to the 2003 census, the village had a population of 32 people.

According to the 2011 census, its population was 24, all but one of them were Serbs.

References

Populated places in Pljevlja Municipality